Wilburn Hartwell Stubblefield (a.k.a. W. H. Stubblefield; he later changed it to Hartwell Wilburn Stubblefield) (1907 in Oklahoma – May 21, 1935 in Indianapolis, Indiana), nicknamed "Stubby", was an American racecar driver. He was killed in a practice crash for the 1935 Indianapolis 500.  He is buried at Angeles Abbey Cemetery, Compton, California. Stubblefield was the son of Michael Stubblefield and Mrs. Lela Middlebrook (a.k.a. Lela Kincheloe Couts). Some sources give his birthdate as December 28, 1909, but most sources say 1907 with no month or day specified. Furthermore, a newspaper article states that he was 27 years old at the time of his death, which implies a birthdate between May 22, 1907 and May 21, 1908. At the time of his death, his home was in Los Angeles. Some sources say that he was born in Los Angeles, but most say that he was born in Oklahoma. The 1910 United States Census lists him as being the age of two when his family was recorded on April 25, 1910, and living in Oklahoma City.

Stubblefield was the first driver ever killed during a qualification attempt at the Indianapolis Motor Speedway when he and Leo Whitaker (his riding mechanic) struck a wall on a time trial run; both were killed. At the time of the crash, their speed was about 116 miles per hour. Stubblefield was survived by his wife Dorothy and his daughter Patricia.

Career award
He was inducted in the National Sprint Car Hall of Fame in 1997.

Indianapolis 500 results

References

American racing drivers
Indianapolis 500 drivers
National Sprint Car Hall of Fame inductees
Racing drivers who died while racing
Sports deaths in Indiana
1907 births
1935 deaths
Racing drivers from Los Angeles
AAA Championship Car drivers
Racing drivers from Oklahoma
Racing drivers from Oklahoma City
Sportspeople from Oklahoma City